Charles-Marie de Féletz (3 January 1767, Gumont – 11 February 1850) was a French churchman, journalist and literary critic.

External links 
 

1767 births
1850 deaths
19th-century French journalists
French male journalists
French literary critics
Members of the Académie Française
19th-century French male writers